Edward Thomas Mitchell (1892 – 6 January 1916) was an English footballer who played in the Southern League for Reading and Swansea Town as a centre or inside forward. He was nicknamed 'Ginger'.

Personal life
By 1911, Mitchell was based at Bulford Barracks with the Royal Field Artillery. On 4 August 1914, the day Britain entered the First World War, Mitchell re-enlisted in the Royal Field Artillery in Scarborough as a gunner; he took part in the Battle of Mons in September and was wounded the following month. On 6 January 1916, having risen to the rank of sergeant, Mitchell was severely wounded during combat on the Western Front and was evacuated to No. 33 Casualty Clearing Station, Béthune, where he died of his wounds. He was buried in Béthune Town Cemetery Extension.

Career statistics

References

1892 births
Date of birth missing
1916 deaths
Footballers from Middlesbrough
Association football inside forwards
English footballers
Southern Football League players
Reading F.C. players
British Army personnel of World War I
Royal Field Artillery soldiers
British military personnel killed in World War I